The Comp Air 7 is an American piston or turboprop-powered light civil utility aircraft manufactured in kit form by Comp Air. It is configured as a conventional high-wing monoplane with tailwheel undercarriage.

The company website does not list it as being in production in 2022.

Operational history
By the fall of 2007 70 Comp Air 7s and 25 Comp Air 7SLs had been completed and were flying.

Variants
Comp Air 7
Piston-powered aircraft typically equipped with a Lycoming IO-540 piston engine of 290 hp
Comp Air 7SLX
Turbine powered aircraft equipped typically with a Walter M601 turboprop of 660 shp

Specifications (typical Comp Air 7SLX)

References

External links

Official website archives on Archive.org

7
Homebuilt aircraft
1990s United States civil utility aircraft
High-wing aircraft
Single-engined tractor aircraft
Single-engined turboprop aircraft